The 2002 National League Championship Series (NLCS) was a Major League Baseball playoff series played from October 9 to 14 to determine the champion of the National League, between the Central Division champion St. Louis Cardinals and the wild-card qualifying San Francisco Giants. It was a rematch of the 1987 NLCS, in which the Cardinals defeated the Giants in seven games. The Cardinals, by virtue of being a division winner, had the home field advantage.

The two teams were victorious in the NL Division Series (NLDS), with the Cardinals defeating the West Division champion and defending World Series champions Arizona Diamondbacks three games to none, and the Giants defeating the East Division champion and heavily favored Atlanta Braves three games to two.

The Giants won the series in five games but were defeated by the Anaheim Angels in seven games in the World Series.

Summary

St. Louis Cardinals vs. San Francisco Giants

Game summaries

Game 1
Wednesday, October 9, 2002 at Busch Stadium (II) in St. Louis, Missouri

The Giants struck first in Game 1 off of Matt Morris with two on via Benito Santiago's single to score Kenny Lofton from second. Next inning, Morris struck out the first two batters, then allowed a single to Lofton, who stole second and scored on Rich Aurilia's single. After Jeff Kent singled, Barry Bonds's triple scored two before Bonds scored on Santiago's single. The Cardinals got on the board in the bottom of the inning off of Kirk Rueter on Fernando Viña's groundout with runners on second and third, but home runs by Lofton in the third and David Bell in the fifth off of Morris gave the Giants a 7−1 lead. Albert Pujols hit a two-run home run in the bottom of the fifth off of Rueter, but the Giants got those runs back in the sixth on Santiago's home run off of Mike Crudale. The Cardinals cut the lead to 9−5 on Miguel Cairo's two-run home run in the bottom of the inning, then made it 9−6 on J. D. Drew's home run in the eighth off of Tim Worrell, but Robb Nen pitched a scoreless ninth for the save as the Giants went up 1−0 in the series.

Game 2
Thursday, October 10, 2002 at Busch Stadium (II) in St. Louis, Missouri

In Game 2, the Giants went up 1−0 on Rich Aurilia's home run in the first off of Woody Williams. His two-run home run in the fifth made it 3−0. Jason Schmidt pitched  shutout innings before allowing Eduardo Pérez's home run in the eighth. The Giants added a run in the ninth on Ramón Martínez's groundout off of Jason Isringhausen with runners on first and third while Robb Nen pitched a scoreless bottom of the inning for his second consecutive save. The Giants went up 2−0 in the series heading to San Francisco.

Game 3
Saturday, October 12, 2002 at Pacific Bell Park in San Francisco

In Game 3, the Giants loaded the bases in the second with no outs off of Chuck Finley, but only scored once on Rich Aurilia's sacrifice fly. The Cardinals responded in the third off of Russ Ortiz when with runners on second and third, Édgar Rentería's sacrifice fly and Jim Edmonds's groundout scored a run each. They added to their lead on home runs by Mike Matheny in the fourth and Edmonds in the fifth, but Barry Bonds's three-run home run in the fifth tied the game. In the sixth, Eli Marrero's leadoff home run off of Jay Witasick proved to be the game winner as the Cardinals' 5−4 win cut the Giants' series lead to 2−1.

Game 4
Sunday, October 13, 2002 at Pacific Bell Park in San Francisco

The Cardinals took an early lead off Liván Hernández, scoring two runs in the first inning on a Jim Edmonds groundout and a single by Tino Martinez.  After being held scoreless for five innings the Giants' bats would answer in the sixth, when J. T. Snow hit a two-run double to score Jeff Kent and Barry Bonds.  In the eighth, Benito Santiago would deliver the key blow for San Francisco with a two-run home run following an intentional walk to Bonds (with nobody on base).  In the ninth, the Cardinals would threaten against Robb Nen, cutting the deficit to 4–3 with a Jim Edmonds single, which put runners at first and third base  with one out for slugger Albert Pujols.  However, Nen struck out Pujols and J. D. Drew to give the Giants a 3–1 series advantage.

Game 5
Monday, October 14, 2002 at Pacific Bell Park in San Francisco

Game 5 was a pitchers' duel between Matt Morris and Kirk Rueter as the Giants looked for their first pennant since 1989. Fernando Viña started the scoring with a seventh-inning sac fly, but the Giants responded with a sac fly by Barry Bonds. In the ninth, Matt Morris retired the first two batters before allowing consecutive singles to David Bell and Shawon Dunston.  Steve Kline was then brought in to pitch to Kenny Lofton, who had yelled at the Cardinals dugout earlier after an inside pitch. On the first pitch, Lofton delivered a single to right field, scoring Bell as J. D. Drew's throw was off-line, clinching the pennant for the Giants, their first since 1989.

Composite line score
2002 NLCS (4–1): San Francisco Giants over St. Louis Cardinals

Aftermath
In the Barry Bonds era (1993-2007), the 2002 postseason would be the only October where the Giants would experience a run of success, let alone win a playoff series (winning two). However, it still did not lead to an elusive World Championship for San Francisco. In the 2002 World Series against the Anaheim Angels, the Giants were eight outs away from winning the Series in Game 6, but late game home runs by Scott Spiezio and Darin Erstad, as well as a two-RBI double by Troy Glaus helped the Angels overcome a five-run, seventh-inning deficit to win. A three-run double by Garret Anderson was the difference in the Angels' Game 7 win to clinch the series. The two teams set a record for combined most home runs in a World Series (21), which stood until the 2017 World Series. The Giants did not win a World Series until 2010.

Despite Dusty Baker's success in San Francisco, he had an increasingly strained relationship with owner Peter Magowan, one that even the Giants' first pennant in thirteen years could not mend. Baker and the Giants mutually parted ways after the season. Baker was not out of work for long as he was quickly snatched up by the Chicago Cubs to become their manager. Baker's Cubs reached the 2003 National League Championship Series, but the team famously fell apart in Game 6 when the Cubs were up 3-0 and five outs from their first World Series appearance in almost 60 years. He would experience success managing the Cincinnati Reds (2010-2013), Washington Nationals (2016-2018), and the Houston Astros (2020-present) in later years. In 2012, his Reds faced his former team the Giants in the National League Division Series. Unfortunately for Baker, his team would again fall apart after leading the series 2-0, eventually losing to the Giants in five games. Baker would finally win a World Series as a manager in 2022 with the Astros.

The St. Louis Cardinals would continue to be a perennial playoff team until 2016, winning two World Championships in 2006 and 2011. Meanwhile, San Francisco would begin re-tooling their roster after losing a close NL West race to the Dodgers on the last weekend of the season in 2004. They did not make the postseason from 2004-2009.
 
The Giants continued their winning ways in the October against St. Louis, beating them in the 2012 National League Championship Series and the 2014 National League Championship Series, on their way to two World Championships in those seasons.

In 2021, Dusty Baker and Tony La Russa would face off again in the American League Division Series. By then, the two men were the oldest managers in MLB at a combined age of 149. Baker's Astros beat La Russa's White Sox in four games on his way to his fourth League Championship Series as manager. He proceeded to win the that series, which made him at the age of 72 the second oldest manager to appear in a World Series, with the 19-year gap between pennants being the second longest for a manager in MLB history.

Notes

External links
2002 NLCS at Baseball-Reference

National League Championship Series
National League Championship Series
San Francisco Giants postseason
St. Louis Cardinals postseason
National League Championship Series
National League Championship Series
National League Championship Series
2000s in St. Louis
National League Championship Series